Eunidia rufula is a species of beetle in the family Cerambycidae. It was described by Fairmaire in 1905. It contains the varietas Eunidia rufula var. pauliani.

References

Eunidiini
Beetles described in 1905